This article provides a list of prisons by country.

A







Australian Capital Territory 
 Alexander Maconochie Centre
 Periodic Detention Centre

New South Wales 
 Bathurst Correctional Centre
 Berrima Correctional Centre
 Brewarrina (Yetta Dhinnakkal) Centre
 Broken Hill Correctional Centre
 Cessnock Correctional Centre
 Cooma Correctional Centre
 Defence Force Correctional Establishment
 Dillwynia Women's Correctional Centre
 Emu Plains Correctional Centre
 Glen Innes Correctional Centre
 Goulburn Correctional Centre
 Grafton Correctional Centre
 Ivanhoe (Warakirri) Correctional Centre
 John Morony Correctional Complex
 Junee Correctional Centre 
 Kirkconnell Correctional Centre
 Lithgow Correctional Centre
 Long Bay Correctional Centre
 Mannus Correctional Centre
 Metropolitan Remand and Reception Centre 
 Mid North Coast Correctional Centre 
 Mulawa Correctional Centre
 Oberon Correctional Centre
 Parklea Correctional Centre
 Parramatta Correctional Centre
 Silverwater Correctional Centre
 St Heliers Correctional Centre
 Tamworth Correctional Centre
 Wellington Correctional Centre

Northern Territory 
 Alice Springs Correctional Centre
 Alice Springs Juvenile Holding Centre
 Berrimah Prison
 Darwin Correctional Centre
 Don Dale Youth Detention Centre
 Wildman River Wilderness Work Camp

Queensland 
 Arthur Gorrie Correctional Centre
 Brisbane Correctional Centre
 Brisbane Women's Correctional Centre
 Capricornia Correctional Centre
 Lotus Glen Correctional Centre
 Maryborough Correctional Centre
 Numinbah Correctional Centre
 Palen Creek Correctional Centre
 Southern Queensland Correctional Centre
 Toowoomba Prison
 Townsville Correctional Centre
 Wolston Correctional Centre
 Woodford Correctional Centre

South Australia 
 Adelaide Pre-Release Centre
 Adelaide Remand Centre
 Adelaide Women's Prison
 Cadell Training Centre
 Mobilong Prison
 Mount Gambier Prison
 Port Augusta Prison
 Port Lincoln Prison
 Yatala Labour Prison

Tasmania 
 Ashley Youth Detention Centre
 Hobart Remand Centre
 Launceston Remand Centre
 Mary Hutchinson Women's Prison
 Risdon Prison Complex

Victoria 
 Acheron Boys Home
 Beechworth Correctional Centre
 Dame Phyllis Frost Centre
 Fulham Correctional Centre
 HM Prison Barwon
 HM Prison Dhurringile
 HM Prison Langi Kal Kal
 HM Prison Loddon
 HM Prison Tarrengower
 Hopkins Correctional Centre (Ararat)
 Marngoneet Correctional Centre
 Melbourne Youth Justice Centre
 Metropolitan Remand Centre
 Port Phillip Prison
 Turana Youth Training Centre
 Ravenhall Prison

Western Australia 
 Acacia Prison
 Albany Regional Prison
 Bandyup Women's Prison
 Banksia Hill Juvenile Detention Centre
 Boronia Pre-release Centre for Women
 Broome Regional Prison
 Bunbury Regional Prison
 Casuarina Prison
 Eastern Goldfields Regional Prison
 Greenough Regional Prison
 Hakea Prison
 Karnet Prison Farm
 Melaleuca Remand and Reintegration Facility
 Pardelup Prison Farm
 Roebourne Regional Prison
Wandoo Reintegration Facility
 West Kimberley Regional Prison
 Wooroloo Prison Farm



B







Carandiru Penitentiary (closed and demolished) - In 1992, the prison was the site of the Carandiru massacre.
 Presidente Bernardes Provisional Readaptation Center (Presidente Bernardes, São Paulo, Brazil) - inspired by the Supermax standards, although prisoners can only stay there for a maximum of 2 years.
 Catanduvas Federal Penitentiary (Catanduvas, Paraná, Brazil) - also based on the Supermax standards. It is the first federal prison in Brazil, designed to receive prisoners deemed too dangerous to be kept in the states' prison systems.
 Campo Grande Federal Penitentiary (Campo Grande, Mato Grosso do Sul, Brazil) - It houses the most dangerous prisoners in the country, as Fernandinho Beira-Mar, the Colombian trafficker Juan Carlos Ramírez Abadía and bicheiro João Arcanjo.
 Presidio of Ahu

C

Maroua Prison
New Bell Prison, Douala
Yoko Prison, Adamaoua





Bío Bío Region
Chillán Public Prison, Chillán
El Manzano, Concepción

Los Ríos Region
Isla Teja Prison (closed), Valdivia
Complejo Penitenciario de Valdivia, Valdivia

Santiago Metropolitan Region
Ex Penitenciaría de Santiago, Santiago
San Miguel Prison, Santiago
Santiago Public Prison (closed), Santiago

List of prisons in Anhui
List of prisons in Beijing
List of prisons in Chongqing
List of prisons in Fujian
List of prisons in Gansu
List of prisons in Guangdong
List of prisons in Guangxi
List of prisons in Guizhou
List of prisons in Hainan
List of prisons in Hebei
List of prisons in Heilongjiang
List of prisons in Henan
List of prisons in Hong Kong
List of prisons in Hubei
List of prisons in Hunan
List of prisons in Inner Mongolia
List of prisons in Jiangsu
List of prisons in Jiangxi province
List of prisons in Jilin
List of prisons in Liaoning
List of prisons in Ningxia
List of prisons in Qinghai
List of prisons in Shaanxi
List of prisons in Shandong
List of prisons in Shanghai
List of prisons in Shanxi province
List of prisons in Sichuan
List of prisons in Tianjin
List of prisons in the Tibet Autonomous Region
List of prisons in Xinjiang
List of prisons in Yunnan
List of prisons in Zhejiang

Macau
 Coloane Prison - opened 1990
 Central Prison - closed 1990
 Ka Ho Prison - opened 2014



County prisons
 Zagreb             
 Gospić
 Pula
 Šibenik
 Osijek
 Rijeka
 Split
 Varaždin
 Bjelovar
 Dubrovnik
 Karlovac
 Požega
 Sisak
 Zadar

State prisons, penitentiaries and prison hospitals
 Glina
 Lepoglava
 Lipovica-Popovača
 Požega
 Turopolja
 Valtura
 Zagreb prison hospital

Former regime prisons and penal colonies
 Goli otok (defunct) (males)
 Sv. Grgur (defunct) (females)



D

Blegdamsvej Prison
 Copenhagen Police Headquarters Prison
 Horsens Statsfængsel (closed 2006, now a prison museum)
 Horserød camp
 Institution of Herstedvester
 Nytorv Prison (for short-term imprisonment, a few hours or less, in between transport to/from another prison and sentencing at Copenhagen City Court)
 State Prison in Jyderup
 State Prison in Møgelkær (closed 2018, facilities maintained and can open again if necessary)
 State Prison in Nyborg
 State Prison in Renbæk
 State Prison in Ringe
 State Prison at Sdr. Omme
 State Prison at Søbysøgård
 State Prison in Vridsløselille (closed 2016)
 State Prison of Central Jutland
 State Prison of East Jutland
 State Prison of Kragskovhede
 Vestre Prison

E

Isla Isabela (historical, as penal colony)
Prison 1, Quito

Scorpion Prison
Tora Prison
Wadi el-Natrun Prison

Nakura, Dahlak Archipelago

Ämari Prison, Ämari (closed 2007)
Fat Margaret, Tallinn (1830s–1917)
Haapsalu Castle (historic)
Harju Gate, Tallinn (historic, demolished)
Harku Prison, Harku (for women; founded 1920s)
Jägala concentration camp, Jägala (1942–1943, during German occupation)
Klooga concentration camp, Klooga (1943–1944, during German occupation)
Lasnamäe Prison, Tallinn (19th century)
Maardu Prison, Maardu (closed)
Murru Prison, Rummu (maximum; founded 1938)
Pagari street, Tallinn (1941, 1944–1991, during Soviet occupation)
Pärnu Prison, Pärnu (closed)
Patarei Prison (Tallinn Central Prison), Tallinn (closed, now Museum)
Tallinn Prison, Tallinn (maximum; founded 1919)
Tartu Prison, Tartu (maximum; founded 2000)
Toompea Castle, Tallinn (in the beginning of 20th century)
Vaivara concentration camp, Vaivara (1943–1944, during German occupation)
Viljandi Prison, Viljandi (closed 2008)
Viru Prison, Jõhvi (maximum; founded 2006)
Võru Prison, Võru (defunct)

External links
Official Website of Estonian Prison Service (in English)
Official Website of Patarei Prison - Culture Park

F

Best known prisons (mostly from 19th century or older, mainly still in function except the Katajanokka Prison and Kakola):
 former Helsinki County Prison or Katajanokka Prison, so called "Nokka" or "Skatta" (1749–2002)
 Sörnäinen Prison, so called "Sörkka", Helsinki
 Turku Prison (formerly 'Kakola', 1853–2007)
 Hämeenlinna Prison, Hämeenlinna (situated in Häme Castle until 1953)
 Oulu Prison, Oulu
 Riihimäki Prison, Riihimäki
 Sukeva Prison, Sonkajärvi
 Konnunsuo Prison, Konnunsuo, Lappeenranta (to be closed 2012)
 Pelso Prison, Vaala

External links
 Official Website of Finnish Prison Service (in English)

Listing from official website: http://www.justice.gouv.fr/minister/DAP/etablissement.htm 
The Bastille, Paris (historic)
Château d'If, Marseille (historic)
Bagne of Toulon (historic)
Clairvaux Prison
Fleury-Mérogis Prison
Fresnes Prison, Fresnes, Val-de-Marne, near Paris
La Santé Prison, Paris
Leandro Prison, Montpellier

G

For a longer list of prisons in Germany see Liste der Justizvollzugsanstalten in Deutschland 
Brandenburg-Görden Prison (now part of a larger complex called Justizvollzugsanstalt Brandenburg an der Havel)
Ebrach Abbey
Hohenasperg
Hoheneck women's prison
Landsberg Prison
Spandau Prison, Berlin (demolished; had only one prisoner during its final 11 years)
Stammheim Prison
Werl Prison, Werl

There are 45 Prisons in Ghana which are managed by the Ghana Prisons Service. In all there are 14,324 prisoners of which 14,125 are males and 199 are females.
Nsawam Prison
Kumasi Prison
Ho Prison
Sunyani Prison

Korydallos Prison, Korydallos
Ioannia Prison, Ioannia
Komotini Prison, Komotini
Corinth Prison, Corinth
Thessaloniki Prison, Thessaloniki
Larissa Prison, Larissa
Nafplio Prison, Nafplio
Neapolis Prison, Neapolis
Tripoli Prison, Tripoli
Chania Prison, Chania
Chios Prison, Chios
Kos Prison, Kos
Amfissa Preventorium For Prisoners, Amfissa

H

Állampusztai Országos Büntetés-végrehajtási Intézet, Állampuszta
Balassagyarmati Fegyház és Börtön, Balassagyarmat
Budapesti Fegyház és Börtön, Budapest
Fiatalkorúak Büntetés-végrehajtási Intézete, Tököl, Szirmabesenyő, Kecskemét
Kalocsai Börtön, Kalocsa
Márianosztrai Fegyház és Börtön, Márianosztra
Nagyfai Országos Büntetés-végrehajtási Intézet, Algyő-nagyfa
Pálhalmai Országos Büntetés-végrehajtási Intézet, Dunaújváros-pálhalma
Sátoraljaújhelyi Fegyház és Börtön, Sátoraljaújhely
Sopronkőhidai Fegyház és Börtön, Sopronkőhida
Szegedi Fegyház és Börtön, Szeged Csillagbörtön / Star Prison
Tiszalöki Országos Büntetés-végrehajtási Intézet, Tiszalök
Váci Fegyház és Börtön, Vác

I





Banceuy Prison, Bandung (defunct)
Kambangan Island
Kerobokan Prison, Bali
Denpasar Prison, Denpasar
Cipinang Penitentiary Institution, Jakarta

Ahvaz
 Ahvaz Central Prison (Sheyban AKA Shiban prison)
 Ahvaz Sepidar Prison
 Karun (closed)
 Sepah Yekkom (Detention Center operated by Ministry of Intelligence) 
Bandar Abbas: Bandar Abbas Prison, Hormozgan Province
Fashafoyeh: See below: Tehran, Central Prison of Tehran
Kahrizak: Kahrizak Prison
Karaj
Fardis Prison "Kachoei prison"
Ghezel Hesar Prison
Rajayi-shahr Prison, AKA Gohardasht prison
Kashan: Kashan Prison
Kerman: Shahab prison
Kermanshah
Dizel Abad Prison
Naft Square Detention Center (operated by Ministry of Intelligence)
 Khorramabad
Khorramabad Central Prison
Falak-ol-Aflak Castle (historic)
Khoy: Khoy Prison, West Azerbaijan Province
Mahabad: Mahabad Prison
Mashhad: Vakil-Abad (Central) Prison
Qarchak: Qarchak Women's Prison (Shahr-e Rey prison, also known as “Gharchak Women’s Prison“ or Varamin prison)
Rasht: Rasht Central Prison, Gilan Province
Sanandaj
Sanandaj Central Prison
Sanandaj Intelligence Office detention center (operated by Ministry of Intelligence)
Sari: Sari Central Prison, Mazandaran Province
Shiraz: Adel Abad Prison
Tabriz: Tabriz Prison, East Azerbaijan Province
Tehran
Ghezel Ghale Prison
Central Prison of Tehran, Fashafoyeh
Evin Prison
Prison 209 or "section 209 of the Evin Prison" (operated by Ministry of Intelligence)
Prison 59 (operated by Sepah-e Pasdaran IRGC)
  Ward 2A, or Section 2A of Evin prison (operated by Sepah-e Pasdaran IRGC)
Heshmatiyeh Prison (operated by Sepah-e Pasdaran IRGC)
Qasr Prison (historic)
Shapour detention centre operated by Iranian Police Criminal Investigation Department (Agahi)
Towhid Prison (historic)
Vozara Detention Center
Urmia: Orumiyeh Central Prison, Darya prison
Zabol: Zabol Central Prison
Zahedan: Zahedan Prison

Baghdad Central Prison, Baghdad

Arbour Hill Prison, Dublin 7
Castlerea Prison, Castlerea, County Roscommon
Cloverhill Prison, Dublin 22
Cork Prison, Cork
Dóchas Centre, Mountjoy Campus, Dublin 7
Kilmainham Gaol (closed)
Limerick Prison, Limerick
Loughan House, County Cavan
Midlands Prison, Co. Laois
Mountjoy Prison, Mountjoy Campus, Dublin 7
Newgate Prison, Dublin (closed)
Portlaoise Prison, Portlaoise, Co. Laois
Richmond General Penitentiary, Grangegorman, Dublin 7 (closed)
Shelton Abbey, Arklow, County Wicklow
St. Patrick's Institution, Mountjoy Campus, Dublin 7
Training Unit, Mountjoy Campus, Dublin 7
Wheatfield Prison, Dublin 22

Maasiyahu Prison
Megiddo prison
Nitzan Detention Center
Hadarim Detention Center
Ktzi'ot Prison
Ramot Prison
Magen Prison
Be'er Sheva Prison
Eshel Prison
Prison Four
Dekel Prison
Kishon Detention Center
Shikma Prison
Maskoveieh
Ketziot Military Prison/Ktzi'ot Prison
Prison Six
Nafha Prison
Neve Tirtza Women's Prison
Ayalon Prison
Ofer Prison
Giv'on Prison
Rimonim Prison
Damun Prison
Gilboa Prison
Tzalmon Prison
Hermon Prison
Shata Prison
HaSharon Prison
Ashmoret Prison
Carmel Prison

Asinara Prison, Sassari
Regina Coeli, Rome
Rebbibia, Rome
Forte Boccea, Rome
Ucciardone, Palermo
San Vittore, Milan
Carcere di Opera, Milan
Giudecca, Venice
Casa di reclusione, Fossano
Casa circondariale di Marassi, Genoa
Casa di reclusione, Eboli
Istituto a custodia attenuata per madri, Turin
Istituto a custodia attenuata, Empoli
Casa circondariale di Rimini, Rimini
Casa circondariale di Forlì, Forlì
Casa di reclusione, Orvieto
Casa circondariale di Pistoia, Pistoia
Casa circondariale di Giarre, Catania
Istituto a custodia attenuata per madri, Cagliari
Casa di reclusione di Altamura, Bari
Sollicciano, Florence
Lorusso Cotugno, Torino
Uta, Cagliari

J





Sapporo Correctional Precinct 
 Sapporo Prison 札幌刑務所 - Higashi-ku, Sapporo
 Sapporo Prison Sapporo Branch 札幌刑務所札幌刑務支所 - Higashi-ku, Sapporo
 Asahikawa Prison 旭川刑務所 - Asahikawa, Hokkaidō
 Obihiro Prison 帯広刑務所 - Obihiro, Hokkaidō
 Obihiro Prison Kushiro Branch 帯広刑務所釧路刑務支所 - Kushiro, Hokkaidō
 Abashiri Prison 網走刑務所 - Abashiri, Hokkaidō
 Tsukigata Prison 月形刑務所 - Tsukigata, Hokkaidō
 Hakodate Juvenile Prison 函館少年刑務所 - Hakodate, Hokkaidō

Sendai Correctional Precinct 
 Aomori Prison 青森刑務所 - Aomori, Aomori
 Miyagi Prison 宮城刑務所 - Wakabayashi-ku, Sendai
 Akita Prison 秋田刑務所 - Akita City
 Yamagata Prison 山形刑務所 - Yamagata, Yamagata
 Fukushima Prison 福島刑務所 - Fukushima, Fukushima
 Fukushima Prison Fukushima Branch 福島刑務所福島刑務支所 - Morioka, Iwate
 Morioka Juvenile Prison 盛岡少年刑務所 - Morioka, Iwate

Tokyo Correctional Precinct 
 Mito Prison 水戸刑務所 - Hitachinaka, Ibaraki
 Tochigi Prison 栃木刑務所 - Tochigi, Tochigi
 Kurobane Prison 黒羽刑務所 - Ōtawara, Tochigi
 Maebashi Prison 前橋刑務所 - Maebashi, Gunma
 Chiba Prison 千葉刑務所 - Wakaba-ku, Chiba
 Ichihara Prison 市原刑務所 - Ichihara, Chiba
 Fuchu Prison 府中刑務所 - Fuchū, Tokyo
 Yokohama Prison 横浜刑務所 - Kōnan-ku, Yokohama
 Yokohama Prison Yokosuka Branch 横浜刑務所横須賀刑務支所 - Yokosuka, Kanagawa
 Niigata Prison 新潟刑務所 - Kōnan-ku, Niigata
 Kofu Prison 甲府刑務所 - Kōfu, Yamanashi
 Nagano Prison 長野刑務所 - Suzaka, Nagano
 Shizuoka Prison 静岡刑務所 - Aoi-ku, Shizuoka
 Kawagoe Juvenile Prison 川越少年刑務所 - Kawagoe, Saitama
 Matsumoto Juvenile Prison 松本少年刑務所 - Matsumoto, Nagano

Nagoya Correctional Precinct 
 Toyama Prison 富山刑務所 - Toyama City
 Kanazawa Prison 金沢刑務所 - Kanazawa, Ishikawa
 Fukui Prison 福井刑務所 - Fukui, Fukui
 Gifu Prison 岐阜刑務所 - Gifu, Gifu
 Kasamatsu Prison 笠松刑務所 - Kasamatsu, Gifu
 Nagoya Prison 名古屋刑務所 - Miyoshi, Aichi
 Nagoya Prison Toyohashi Branch 名古屋刑務所豊橋刑務支所 - Toyohashi, Aichi
 Mie Prison 三重刑務所 - Tsu, Mie

Osaka Correctional Precinct 
 Shiga Prison 滋賀刑務所 - Ōtsu, Shiga
 Kyoto Prison 京都刑務所 - Yamashina-ku, Kyoto
 Osaka Prison 大阪刑務所 - Sakai-ku, Sakai
 Kobe Prison 神戸刑務所 - Akashi, Hyōgo
 Kakogawa Prison 加古川刑務所 - Kakogawa, Hyōgo
 Wakayama Prison 和歌山刑務所 - Wakayama, Wakayama
 Himeji Prison 姫路少年刑務所 - Himeji, Hyōgo
 Nara Juvenile Prison 奈良少年刑務所 - Nara, Nara

Hiroshima Correctional Precinct 
 Tottori Prison 鳥取刑務所 - Tottori, Tottori
 Matsue Prison 松江刑務所 - Matsue, Shimane
 Okayama Prison 岡山刑務所 - Kita-ku, Okayama
 Hiroshima Prison 広島刑務所 - Naka-ku, Hiroshima
 Hiroshima Prison Onomichi Branch 広島刑務所尾道刑務支所 - Onomichi, Hiroshima
 Yamaguchi Prison 山口刑務所 - Yamaguchi, Yamaguchi
 Iwakuni Prison 岩国刑務所 - Iwakuni, Yamaguchi

Takamatsu Correctional Precinct 
 Tokuchima Prison 徳島刑務所 - Tokushima, Tokushima
 Takamatsu Prison 高松刑務所 - Takamatsu, Kagawa
 Matsuyama Prison 松山刑務所 - Tōon, Ehime
 Matsuyama Prison Saijo Branch 松山刑務所西条刑務支所 - Saijō, Ehime
 Kochi Prison 高知刑務所 - Kōchi, Kōchi

Fukuoka Correctional Precinct 
 Fukuoka Prison 福岡刑務所 - Umi, Fukuoka
 Fumoto Prison 麓刑務所 - Tosu, Saga
 Sasebo Prison 佐世保刑務所 - Sasebo, Nagasaki
 Nagasaki Prison 長崎刑務所 - Isahaya, Nagasaki
 Kumamoto Prison 熊本刑務所 - Kumamoto, Kumamoto
 Oita Prison 大分刑務所 - Ōita, Ōita
 Miyazaki Prison 宮崎刑務所 - Miyazaki, Miyazaki
 Kagoshima Prison 鹿児島刑務所 - Yūsui, Kagoshima
 Okinawa Prison 沖縄刑務所 - Nanjō, Okinawa
 Okinawa Prison Yaeyama Branch 沖縄刑務所八重山刑務支所 - Ishigaki, Okinawa
 Saga Juvenile Prison 佐賀少年刑務所 - Saga, Saga

Medical Prison 
 Hachioji Medical Prison 八王子医療刑務所 - Hachiōji, Tokyo
 Okazaki Medical Prison 岡崎医療刑務所 - Okazaki, Aichi
 Osaka Medical Prison 大阪医療刑務所 - Sakai-ku, Sakai
 Kitakyushu Medical Prison 北九州医療刑務所 - Kokuraminami-ku, Kitakyūshū

Social Rehabilitation Program Center（Private Finance Initiative, PFI system） 
 Mine Rehabilitation Program Center 美祢社会復帰促進センター - Mine, Yamaguchi
 Kitsuregawa Rehabilitation Program Center 喜連川社会復帰促進センター - Sakura, Tochigi
 Harima Rehabilitation Program Center -播磨社会復帰促進センター - Kakogawa, Hyōgo
 Shimane Asahi Rehabilitation Program Center　島根あさひ社会復帰促進センター - Hamada, Shimane

K

Sulaibiya Central Prison

L

Phonthong Prison, near Vientiane
Samkhe Prison, near Vientiane

Lukiškės Prison, Vilnius
Kaunas Prison, Kaunas

M

Antanimora Prison, Antananarivo
Farafangana prison, Farafangana

Zomba Central Prison, Zomba
Maula Prison, Lilongwe
Chichiri Prison, Blantyre
Mzimba Prison, Mzimba

Perlis Correctional Centre
Pokok Sena Prison 
Alor Setar Prison
Sungai Petani Prison
Penang Remand Prison
Seberang Perai Prison
Kamunting Detention Centre
Taiping Prison
Batu Gajah Correctional Centre
Tapah Prison
Sungai Buloh Prison
Kajang Prison
Kajang Women's Prison
Seremban Prison
Jelebu Drug Rehabilitation Institution
Bandar Hilir Prison
Sungai Udang Prison
Dusun Dato' Murad Pre-Release Prison
Henry Gurney School Telok Mas
Johor Bahru Remand Prison
Muar Correctional Centre
Simpang Renggam Prison
Kluang Prison
Penor Prison
Bentong Prison
Marang Prison
Machang Correctional Centre
Pengkalan Chepa Prison
Puncak Borneo Prison
Sri Aman Central Prison
Sibu Central Prison
Miri Central Prison
Limbang Central Prison
Kota Kinabalu Central Prison
Kota Kinabalu Women's Prison
Sandakan Prison
Tawau Central Prison
Henry Gurney School Keningau

Corradino Correctional Facility, Paola
Gozo Prison, Victoria (defunct)
Gran Prigione (Slaves' Prison), Valletta (defunct)
Many of the fortifications, such as Fort Saint Elmo and Fort Ricasoli, were also used as prisons at some point.

Cefereso No. 9, Ciudad Juarez
Federal Social Readaptation Center No. 1, Almoloya de Juarez
Palacio de Lecumberri, Mexico City  (defunct)
Penal del Altiplano, Almoloya de Juarez
Islas Marías Federal Prison, Marías Islands
La Mesa Prison, Tijuana

Remand Prison of Monaco

Tazmamart, Atlas Mountains (defunct)

N

Zaanstad
Rotterdam
Veenhuizen
Esserheem
Zwolle





Operating political prison camps 
 Kwan-li-so No. 14 Kaechon
 Kwan-li-so No. 15 Yodok
 Kwan-li-so No. 16 Hwasong
 Kwan-li-so No. 18 Bukchang
 Kwan-li-so No. 22 Haengyong
 Kwan-li-so No. 25 Chongjin

Former political prison camps 
 Kwan-li-so No. 12 Onsong

Operating reeducation camps 
 Kyo-hwa-so No. 1 Kaechon
 Kyo-hwa-so No. 3 Sinuiju
 Kyo-hwa-so No. 4 Kangdong
 Kyo-hwa-so No. 8 Yongdam
 Kyo-hwa-so No. 11 Chungsan
 Kyo-hwa-so No. 12 Chongori
 Kyo-hwa-so No. 15 Hamhung
 Kyo-hwa-so No. 22 Oro
 Kyo-hwa-so No. 77 Danchun
 Kyo-hwa-so Hoeryong

Former reeducation camps 
 Kyo-hwa-so Sŭnghori

Arendal Prison
 Bastøy Prison
 Berg Prison
 Bergen Prison
 Bjørgvin Prison
 Bodø Prison
 Bredtveit Detention and Security Prison
 Bruvoll Prison
 Drammen Prison
 Fredrikstad Prison
 Gjøvik Prison
 Halden Prison (New 2010)
 Hamar Prison
 Hassel Prison
 Haugesund Prison
 Hof Prison
 Horten Prison
 Hustad Prison
 Ila Detention and Security Prison
 Ilseng Prison
 Indre Østfold Prison
 Kongsvinger Prison
 Kragerø Prison
 Kristiansand Prison
 Larvik Prison
 Mosjøen Prison
 Moss Prison
 Oslo Prison
 Ravneberget Prison
 Ringerike Prison
 Sandefjord Prison
 Sandeid Prison
 Sarpsborg Prison
 Sem Prison
 Skien Prison
 Stavanger Prison
 Tromsø Prison
 Trondheim Prison
 Ullersmo Prison
 Vadsø Prison
 Verdal Prison
 Vestre Slidre Prison
 Vik Prison
 Ålesund Prison
 Åna Prison

P



Sindh 
 Karachi Central Jail, Karachi
 Hyderabad Jail, Hyderabad
 Sukkar Jail (old), Sukkar
 Sukkar Jail (new), Sukkar
 Larkana Jail, Larkana
 Khairpur Jail, Khairpur
 Malir Jail, Karachi
 Nawabshah Jail, Nawabshah
 Mirpurkhas Jail, Mirpurkhas
 Sanghar Jail, Sanghar
 Jacobabad Jail, Jacobabad
 Dadu Jail, Dadu
 Badin Jail, Badin
 Shikarpur Jail, Shikarpur
 Nara Jail, Hyderabad
 Women's Jail, Karachi
 Women's Jail, Hyderabad

Punjab 
 Central Jail Lahore (at Kot Lakhpat)
 Central Jail Gujranwala
 Central Jail Sahiwal
 District Jail Lahore
 District Jail Sheikhupura
 District Jail Kasur
 District Jail Sialkot
 New Central Jail Multan
 New Central Jail Bahawalpur
 Borstal Institution and Juvenile Jail Bahawalpur
 Central Jail Dera Ghazi Khan
 District Jail Multan
 District Jail Rajanpur
 District Jail Vehari
 Women Jail Multan
 District Jail Rahim Yar Khan
 District Jail Bahawalnagar
 District Jail Muzaffar Garh
 Central Jail Rawalpindi
 District Jail Attock
 District Jail Jhelum
 District Jail Mandi Bahauddin
 District Jail Gujrat
 Sub Jail Chakwal
 Central Jail Faisalabad
 Central Jail Mianwali
 Borstal Institution and Juvenile Jail Faisalabad
 District Jail Faisalabad
 District Jail Jhang
 District Jail Toba Tek Singh
 District Jail Sargodha
 District Jail Shahpur

Kraków-Podgórze Detention Centre
 Mokotów Prison
 Montelupich Prison
 Wronki Prison

Miguel Castro Castro prison

R

Aiud Prison, Aiud
Gherla Prison, Gherla
Pitești Prison, Pitești



Remand prisons 
Butyrka Prison, Moscow
Corrective colony No. 2, Mordovia
Corrective colony No. 2, Vladimir Oblast
Matrosskaya Tishina, Moscow
Kresty Prison, Saint Petersburg
Biysk Prison, Biysk
Yekaterinburg Remand Prison, Yekaterinburg
Makhachkala Prison, Makhachkala
Simferpol Prison, Simferopol

Former KGB remand prisons 
Lubyanka Prison, Moscow 
Lefortovo Prison, Moscow
Bolshoy Dom, Saint Petersburg

Maximum security prisons
Pyatak Prison, Ognenny Ostrov
Vladimir Central Prison, Vladimir
Samara Penitentiary, Samara
Black Dolphin Prison, Sol-Iletsk
White Swan (prison),  Solikamsk
Black Eagle Prison, Ivdel
Snowy Owl Prison, Kharp
Saransk Prison, Saransk
Sosnovka Prison, Sosnovka
Saratov Prison, Saratov
Petek Island Prison
Mordovia Prison, Mordovia
Minusinskaya Prison, Minusinsk
Tomsk Prison, Tomsk
Volgograd Prison, Volgograd
Kopeysk Prison, Kopeysk
Ryazan Prison, Ryazan
Krasnodar Prison, Krasnodar
Petrozavodsk Prison, Petrozavodsk
Yekaterinburg Prison, Yekaterinburg
Tula Prison, Shchyokino (town), Tula Oblast
Priuralsky Prison, Priuralsky District

S

al-Ha'ir Prison, near Riyadh
Jeddah Prison, Jeddah
Rafha Prison, Rafha
ʽUlaysha Prison, Mabahith prison in Riyadh

Prisons
Admiralty West Prison
Changi Prison Complex
Changi Women's Prison and Drug Rehabilitation Centre
Selarang Park Community Supervision Centre
Tanah Merah Prison

Drug Rehabilitation Centres
Changi Women's Prison and Drug Rehabilitation Centre

Former prisons and detention centres
Outram Prison
Changi Prison
Moon Crescent Prison
Queenstown Remand Prison
Portsdown Prison
Tampines Prison
Sembawang Drug Rehabilitation Centre
Khalsa Crescent Prison
Kaki Bukit Centre
Bedok Reformative Centre
Lloyd Leas Work Release Camp

Ilava Prison, Ilava
 Leopoldov Prison, Leopoldov



Operational prisons 
Reference
A Lama Prison, A Lama, Pontevedra
Alhaurín de la Torre Prison, Alhaurín de la Torre, Málaga
Albacete Prison, Albacete
Albocàsser Prison, Albocàsser, Castellón
Albolote Prison, Albolote, Granada
Alcalá de Guadaira Prison, Alcalá de Guadaira, Seville
Alcalá-Meco Prison, Alcalá de Henares, Community of Madrid
Alcázar de San Juan Prison, Alcázar de San Juan, Ciudad Real
Alicante Prison, Alicante
Alicante II Prison, Villena, Alicante
Almería Prison, Almería
Aranjuez Prison, Aranjuez, Community of Madrid
Arrecife de Lanzarote Prison, Teguise, Las Palmas
Ávila Prison, Brieva, Ávila
Badajoz Prison, Badajoz
Barcelona Model Prison, Barcelona
Bilbao Prison, Basauri, Biscay
Botafuegos Prison, Algeciras, Cádiz
Bonxe Prison, Outeiro de Rei, Lugo
Burgos Prison, Burgos
Cáceres Prison, Cáceres
Can Brians Prison, Sant Esteve Sesrovires, Barcelona
Castellón Prison, Castellón de la Plana
Centro Penitenciario de Valencia Prison, Picassent, Valencia
Ceuta Prison, Ceuta
Córdoba Prison, Córdoba
Daroca Prison, Daroca, Zaragoza
El Dueso Prison, Dueso, Santoña, Cantabria
Figueres Prison, Figueres, Girona
Girona Prison, Girona
Estremera Prison, Estremera, Community of Madrid
Herrera de la Mancha Prison, Manzanares, Ciudad Real
Huelva Prison, Huelva
Ibiza Prison, Ibiza, Balearic Islands
Jaén Prison, Jaén
La Moraleja Prison, Dueñas, Palencia
Lledoners Prison, Sant Joan de Vilatorrada, Barcelona
Lleida Prison, Lleida
Las Palmas Prison, Las Palmas de Gran Canaria
Logroño Prison, Logroño, La Rioja
Mansilla de las Mulas Prison, Mansilla de las Mulas, Léon
Melilla Prison, Melilla
Monterroso Prison, Monterroso, Lugo
Morón de la Frontera Prison, Morón de la Frontera, Seville
Murcia Prison, Murcia
Nanclares de la Oca Prison, Langraiz-Oka, Álava
Navalcarnero Prison, Navalcarnero, Community of Madrid
Ocaña Prison, Ocaña, Toledo
Palma Prison, Palma, Balearic Islands
Pamplona Prison, Pamplona, Navarre
Pereiro de Aguiar Prison, Pereiro de Aguiar, Ourense
Puerto Prison, Puerto de Santa María, Cádiz
Quatre Camins Prison, la Roca del Vallès, Barcelona
San Sebastián Prison, San Sebastián, Gipuzkoa
Santa Cruz de la Palma Prison, Santa Cruz de la Palma, Santa Cruz de Tenerife
Santa Cruz de Tenerife Prison, El Rosario, Santa Cruz de Tenerife
Segovia Prison, Segovia
Seville Prison, Seville
Soria Prison, Soria
Soto del Real Prison, Soto del Real, Community of Madrid
Tarragona Prison, Tarragona
Teixeiro Prison, Curtis, A Coruña
Teruel Prison, Teruel
Topas Prison, Topas, Salamanca
Valdemoro Prison, Valdemoro, Community of Madrid
Valladolid Prison, Villanubla, Valladolid
Villabona Prison, Llanera, Asturias
Zuera Prison, Zuera, Zaragoza
Wad-Ras Prison, Barcelona

Former prisons 
Carabanchel Prison, Madrid
Cárcel Modelo, Madrid
Cárcel Real of Cádiz, Cádiz
Madrid Model Prison, Madrid
Málaga Prison, Málaga
Les Corts Prison, Barcelona
Porlier Prison, Madrid
Ranilla Prison, Seville
Trinitat Prison, Barcelona

Prisons planned and under construction 
Tàrrega prison, Tàrrega, Lleida
El Catllar prison, el Catllar, Tarragona
Zona Franca prison, Barcelona

Kobar Prison

Långholmen prison, Stockholm (defunct, now operating as a hotel and museum)
Kumla prison, Kumla
Hall prison, Södertälje
Norrtälje prison, Norrtälje



Far'Falastin
Hesekê Hasakah Central Prison
Tadmor Prison
Mezze Prison (closed)
Chirkin prison, Qamishli
Sednaya Prison

T

Taipei Prison

Buddha Monthon Temporary Prison, Dhaveevatthana Palace (part of Klong Prem Central Prison)
Bang Kwang Central Prison, Nonthaburi Province
Khao Kho District Jail, Phetchabun Province
Nong Khai Immigration Detention Center, Nong Khai Province

Remand prisons
Thailand has four remand prisons:

Bangkok Remand Prison
Minburi Remand Prison
Pattaya Remand Prison (Chonburi Province)
Thonburi Remand Prison



U

Dubai Central Jail, Al Aweer, Dubai
Dubai Women's Central Jail
Sharjah Reformatory and Punitive Establishment  (SRPE)





V

Chí Hòa Prison
Phú Quốc Prison

Y

Beir Ahmed

Others
Abu Ghraib, Iraq
Bangkwang, Nonthaburi Province, Thailand, nicknamed the "Big Tiger"
Camp Boiro, Conakry, Guinea
Camp Crame, Manila, Philippines
 Chikurubi, Zimbabwe
Devil's Island, French Guiana
Ezeiza Women's Prison, Buenos Aires, Argentina
Hanoi Hilton, Hanoi, Vietnam (POW prison; historical)
Insein Prison, Myanmar
Palacio de Lecumberri, Mexico City, Mexico
Penal del Altiplano, Almoloya de Juárez, Mexico
Playa Negra (Black Beach), Equatorial Guinea
Robben Island, South Africa

References